The Sting Ray is a British acoustic homing lightweight torpedo (LWT) manufactured by GEC-Marconi, who were later bought out by BAE Systems. It entered service in 1983.

Design and development
In the 1950s the Royal Navy was equipped with British designed and built Mk 30 air-dropped torpedoes. These were passive homing weapons which relied on detecting the noise from submarine targets. However, as submarine noise levels decreased these weapons became ineffective. A design for a British Mk 31 torpedo which would have used active echo-location sonar failed to receive Government approval for production. US Mk 44 torpedoes were purchased for the Royal Navy in the 1960s to fill this role, and later replaced by US Mk 46 torpedoes.

A desire not to be dependent on US torpedo purchases led to a research programme starting in 1964 to develop a British torpedo. Initially designated Naval and Air Staff Requirement (NASR) 7511, it was (much later in the late 1970s) designated the Sting Ray torpedo.

Design
Design studies in the mid-1960s proposed that a tank of polyethylene oxide be carried behind the warhead. This polymer would be exuded at the nose to reduce the drag coefficient. Experiments using buoyancy-propelled torpedoes in 1969 had shown reductions in the drag coefficient up to 25%. However, by 1969 this scheme had been rejected in favour of carrying a larger battery.

The homing system developed in the mid-1960s incorporated a spinning magnetic disc onto which the acoustic correlation algorithms were etched but this was replaced by integrated circuit technology when the disc sometimes failed to survive the impact of the weapon with the sea from high altitude launches.

The original warhead concept was for a simple omnidirectional blast charge. However, studies in the 1970s showed that this would be inadequate against the large double-hulled submarines then entering service. A directed energy (shaped charge) warhead was used in the production weapon.

In 1976 the designs had to be completely revised. Swapping the project for buying a ready-made US torpedo was not considered because the torpedo was expected to be better, and was all-British.

Manufacture
The torpedo was built at the MSDS (later MUSL) plants at Neston (in Cheshire) and MUSL in Farlington and Waterlooville near Portsmouth. Guidance systems were made by Sperry Gyroscope Company.

Deployment
The original in-service version (Sting Ray Mod 0) is officially documented as entering service in 1983, although Mark Higgitt's book Through Fire and Water (2013), which tells the story of HMS Ardent during the Falklands conflict, states that operational Stingray torpedoes were transferred to the ship immediately prior to its sailing date of 19 April 1982 under conditions of great secrecy (pp. 56, 61). It is propelled by a pump jet driven by an electric motor. Power is supplied by a magnesium/silver-chloride sea water battery. The propulsion method combines high speed, deep diving, agility and low noise levels. The weapon is provided with target and environmental information by the launching platform. Once launched it operates autonomously, with tactical software searching for the target using active sonar and then homing in without any further assistance. The software is designed to deal with the employment of countermeasures by the target. The weapon is designed to be launched from fixed wing or rotary winged aircraft and surface ships against submarine targets.

The development of the torpedo cost £920 million. The Mark 24 Tigerfish submarine-launched torpedo had also overshot its initial budget.

Operators

Current operators

Royal Navy

Royal Norwegian Navy

Royal Thai Navy

Romanian Navy

Royal Moroccan Navy

Specifications
 Length: 
 Diameter: 
 Weight: 
 Warhead:  of HE in a shaped charge
 Speed: 
 Range: 
 Depth: 
 Propulsion: Magnesium/silver chloride seawater battery (Pump-jet)
 Guidance  Active/Passive sonar

Dimensions
Only ships fitted/refitted with the larger STWS-2 or Magazine Torpedo Weapon System can use it.

Sting Ray Mod 1 is intended for use against the same targets as Sting Ray Mod 0 but with an enhanced capability against small clad conventional submarines via a shaped-charge insensitive explosive warhead from TDW, and an improved shallow-water performance. It shares many hull components with the original weapon.

See also
 APR-3E torpedo - Russian equivalent
 A244-S - Italian equivalent
 Mark 54 Lightweight Torpedo - US Navy's equivalent
 MU90 Impact - French/Italian equivalent
 TAL Shyena - Indian equivalent
 Yu-7 torpedo - Chinese equivalent
 K745 Chung Sang Eo - South Korean equivalent
 Type 97 light weight torpedo (G-RX4) - Japanese equivalent

References

External links
 Royal Navy
 Royal Air Force
 BAE Systems
 Photo of Sting Ray torpedo
 Photo of British Mk 30 torpedo
 Drag Reduction Experiments for Sting Ray, 1968 - 1971
 Norway order Sting Ray mod 1 for frigates, helicopters

Naval weapons of the Cold War
Naval weapons of the United Kingdom
Torpedoes of the United Kingdom
Aerial torpedoes
Weapons and ammunition introduced in 1983
General Electric Company
BAE Systems weapons systems